Alberto Demiddi (11 April 1944 – 25 October 2000) was an Argentine rower who specialized in the single sculls event. He competed in the 1964, 1968 and 1972 Summer Olympics and placed fourth, third and second, respectively. He held the world title in 1970 and European title in 1969 and 1971. In 2010 he won the Honor Konex Award from Argentina as recognition for his sport merits during his life.

References

External links

 

1944 births
2000 deaths
Argentine male rowers
Rowers from Buenos Aires
Olympic rowers of Argentina
Rowers at the 1964 Summer Olympics
Rowers at the 1968 Summer Olympics
Rowers at the 1972 Summer Olympics
Olympic silver medalists for Argentina
Olympic bronze medalists for Argentina
Olympic medalists in rowing
World Rowing Championships medalists for Argentina
Medalists at the 1972 Summer Olympics
Medalists at the 1968 Summer Olympics
Pan American Games medalists in rowing
Pan American Games gold medalists for Argentina
Rowers at the 1967 Pan American Games
Rowers at the 1971 Pan American Games
European Rowing Championships medalists
Medalists at the 1967 Pan American Games
Medalists at the 1971 Pan American Games